Lidiya Ivanova may refer to:
Lidiya Ivanova (gymnast) (b. 1937), Soviet Olympic Gymnast
Lidiya Ivanova (journalist) (1936–2007), Soviet rower, print and television journalist, television announcer and writer